Sprankle is a surname. Notable people with the surname include:

Dale R. Sprankle (1898–1963), American sports coach and athletic director, brother of LeRoy
LeRoy Sprankle (1894–1972), American high school sports coach and athletics advocate